Black Narcissus is an album by the group Mephista, which comprises pianist Sylvie Courvoisier, electronic artist Ikue Mori and percussionist Susie Ibarra, which was released on the Tzadik label in 2002.

Reception

In a review for AllMusic, Jesse Jarnow states "listening to Black Narcissus can be a confusing and trying experience. Each sound suggests something new, and all three musicians are wont to follow that impulse as quickly as possible. It is liberating and beautiful, but also so hyper that it is impossible to listen to with anything but rapt attention. Unless one commits fully to the disc, it will probably sound like an experimental annoyance. If one is willing to surrender, though, there is a rich world waiting".

Track listing 
All compositions by Mephista
 "The Children's Hour" - 3:25  
 "Black Narcissus" - 6:45  
 "Willow's Weep" - 8:11  
 "Cabbalussa" - 7:05  
 "Poison Ivy" - 3:25  
 "Black Widow" - 14:47  
 "Legend of Pele" - 6:03  
 "Leda and the Swan" - 5:38  
 "Laughing Medusa" -  3:13

Personnel 
 Sylvie Courvoisier – piano 
 Ikue Mori – laptop
 Susie Ibarra - drums

References 

2002 albums
Tzadik Records albums
Sylvie Courvoisier albums